Remei Sipi Mayo (born 1952), known as Tía Remei, is a Spain-based Equatoguinean writer, editor, educator, and activist focused on gender and development. 

She is noted for her activism in the Afro-descendent women's movement, and she previously served as president of the Federación de Asociaciones Guineanas de Cataluña (Federation of Guinean Associations of Catalonia).

Biography 
Remei Sipi was born in 1952 in Rebola, a town on the island of Bioko in Equatorial Guinea. In 1968, when she was 16 years old, she moved to live in Barcelona. She graduated with a degree in childhood education and a specialization in gender and development from the Autonomous University of Barcelona.

As an activist, she has worked to defend women, ethnic minorities, and immigrants. She has promoted the African women's movement, working to avoid folklorization—in which foreigners are defined by their cultural otherness—at intercultural events.

In the early 1980s, she became president of Riebapua, a collective of members of the Bubi people from Equatorial Guinea in Catalonia. In 1990, she co-founded the organization E’Waiso Ipola, which means "woman, lift yourself up/get woke." Three years later, she became one of the co-founders of the Spanish association of African intellectuals MFUNDI-KUPA. She also co-founded and led Yamanjá, a network of immigrant women in Catalonia, in 2005.

She was also a member of the Network of Black and Ethnic Minority Women in Europe, the Support Platform for political prisoners in Equatorial Guinea, and various other women's organizations.

In addition to oral literature and essays, Sipi has written several books on gender and African migrant women. She is the founder of Editorial Mey, a publisher focused on Equatoguinean literature.

Selected works 

 1997 - Las mujeres africanas: Incansables creadoras de estrategias
 2004 - Inmigración y género. El caso de Guinea Ecuatorial
 2005 - Les dones migrades [Texto impreso]: apunts, històries, reflexions, aportacions
 2005 - Cuentos africanos
 2007 - El secreto del bosque: un cuento africano
 2015 - Baiso, ellas y sus relatos, with Nina Camo and Melibea Obono
 2015 - Voces femeninas de Guinea Ecuatorial. Una antología
 2018 - Mujeres africanas: Más allá del tópico de la jovialidad

References 

1952 births
Equatoguinean women writers
Equatoguinean activists
Autonomous University of Barcelona alumni
People from Bioko Norte
Equatoguinean expatriates in Spain
Living people